Conus kinoshitai, common name Kinoshita's cone, is a species of sea snail, a marine gastropod mollusk in the family Conidae, the cone snails and their allies.

These snails are predatory and venomous. They are capable of "stinging" humans, therefore live ones should be handled carefully or not at all.

Description
The size of an adult shell varies between 40 mm and 94 mm.

Distribution
This species occurs in the South China Sea and in the Pacific Ocean from the Philippines to the Solomons. There are also records in the Indian Ocean from Mozambique, Madagascar, and Réunion.

References

 Filmer R.M. (2001). A Catalogue of Nomenclature and Taxonomy in the Living Conidae 1758 – 1998. Backhuys Publishers, Leiden. 388pp.
 Tucker J.K. (2009). Recent cone species database. September 4, 2009 Edition.
 Tucker J.K. & Tenorio M.J. (2009) Systematic classification of Recent and fossil conoidean gastropods. Hackenheim: Conchbooks. 296 pp.
 Puillandre N., Duda T.F., Meyer C., Olivera B.M. & Bouchet P. (2015). One, four or 100 genera? A new classification of the cone snails. Journal of Molluscan Studies. 81: 1–23

External links
 The Conus Biodiversity website
 
 Cone Shells – Knights of the Sea
 Manuel J. Tenorio, Eric Monnier & Nicolas Puillandre - Notes on Afonsoconus Tucker & Tenorio, 2013 (Gastropoda, Conidae), with description of a new species from the Southwestern Indian Ocean; European Journal of Taxonomy 472: 1–20, 2018

kinoshitai
Gastropods described in 1956